Xenia Station, located at 150 Miami Avenue in Xenia, Ohio, in the United States, is a replica of Xenia's 1880s brick railroad station.

Built in 1998 by the city of Xenia, Xenia Station houses a local history museum, a classroom/meeting space and  an observation tower called the Hub Lookout.

Xenia Station is the hub for 5 regional rail trails, two of which are segments of the unfinished Ohio to Erie Trail, which will run from Cincinnati to Cleveland.

Facilities
Xenia Station was designed by Schooley Caldwell Architects in 1998 and custom built for the city of Xenia by a local contractor and is located on a  city park of the same name, which has play equipment, picnic tables, a picnic shelter, nature areas, a splash pad, a caboose and off-street parking. The site is the former PRR freight yards. The building's first floor houses a local history museum which includes  railroad memorabilia while the second floor has a classroom/meeting space. Xenia Station is also the hub for 5 regional rail trails, two of which are segments of the unfinished Ohio to Erie Trail, which will run from Cincinnati to Cleveland. In addition to the museum and classroom/meeting space, the building also has restrooms, vending machines and water for the bicyclists, hikers and others who use the park. It also has a large map of the rail trails and  the Hub Lookout, which is a tower accessible by spiral staircase that provides a panoramic view of the rail trails.

Railroad history
As late as 1960, Xenia had three rail lines running through it, as follows:
 The Baltimore & Ohio Wellston subdivision, which ran between Washington Court House and Dayton;
 The Pennsylvania Railroad's (PRR) Little Miami branch, between Cincinnati and Springfield: and
 The PRR's Pittsburgh to St. Louis mainline. Amtrak utilized this line for the National Limited until 1979.

All three route saw diminished usage by the early 1980s: each was eventually abandoned and dismantled. PRR's Pittsburgh-St. Louis mainline, owned by Conrail after 1976, remained intact until the late 1980s.

Rail trails
The crossing of the three railroad lines created six spokes on a wheel with Xenia Station in the center. Of these six spokes, five have been converted for interim rail trail use.

The one exception was the B&O line west to Dayton which did not become a trail because it closely paralleled the PRR line to Dayton.

Clockwise from the north, the five trails are:

North
The northern branch of the Little Miami Scenic Trail runs from Xenia to Yellow Springs and on to Springfield. This is the former PRR line to Springfield.

Northeast
The Prairie Grass Trail (a part of the Ohio to Erie Trail) runs from Xenia to Cedarville and to London and beyond. Former PRR Pittsburgh-St. Louis mainline east to London and Columbus.

East
The Xenia-Jamestown Connector will run from Xenia to Jamestown and beyond, but there is now a short gap from Xenia Station to Jasper Road. Former B&O Wellston Subdivision to Chillicothe and Wellston.

South
The southern branch of the Little Miami Scenic Trail is a part of the Ohio to Erie Trail and runs from Xenia to Milford and beyond. Former PRR line to Cincinnati.

West
The Creekside Trail, known as the Creekside Recreation Trail in Montgomery County, runs from Xenia to Dayton. Former PRR Pittsburgh-St. Louis mainline to Dayton.

See also
 Columbus and Xenia Railroad
 Little Miami Railroad

References

External links
 Miami Valley Bike Trails - Xenia Station
 David Matthews
 Greene County Parks and Trails: Stations and Staging Places on Greene Trails - includes Xenia Station
 Ohio Bikeways - Xenia Station
 Xenia Community Schools
 City of Xenia list of parks including Xenia Station
 City of Xenia gallery for Xenia Station

Xenia, Ohio
Museums in Greene County, Ohio
Buildings and structures in Greene County, Ohio
History museums in Ohio